Ivano-Frankivsk Oblast local election, 2010 is a local election in Ivano-Frankivsk Oblast that took place on October 31, 2010. Seats were split among 13 political parties.

Results 

Chairman of the council elections
 Oleksandr Sych (regional leader of Svoboda)
 Zynoviy Mytnyk (Minister of Ukraine in protection of health)

Ivano-Frankivsk city council

Mayor elections
 Anushkevychus (Ukrainian People's Party) - 27.20%
 Solovei (Third power) - 22.48%
 Prokopiv (Front of Changes) - 14.50%
 Against all - 4.50%

Notes
Due to the lack of candidates to deputies, All-Ukrainian Union "Freedom" chose not to fill its available place in the Ivano-Frankivsk city council cutting the size of the council to 59.

References

External links 
 Official website Ivano-Frankivsk Oblast Council
 Results of the 2010 local elections (Ukrainian pravda)
  Glavred analysis of the 2010 Ukrainian local elections (West)

Local elections in Ukraine
2010 elections in Ukraine
Ivano-Frankivsk Oblast
October 2010 events in Ukraine